Shop TV is a 24-hour shopping related TV channel owned by Solar Entertainment Corporation. Aside from its dedicated channel, Shop TV also airs through SolarFlix.

About
The idea for a 24/7 shopping channel in the Philippines was not as ubiquitous as it is today. It all began when a family of entrepreneurs decided to take a risk in October 2003, and introduced the concept of home shopping networks to the Philippine market.

Initially, ShopTV of Home Shopping Network aired for 12 hours daily starting last November 2005. It expanded its coverage to 24/7 airing by August 2006.

Programs

Currently aired

Shopping programs and segments
A Better You
Budget Sized
Gifted!
Gotta Have It!
Mandatories
Picks-of-the-Week
Project Home
Shop TV Classics
Shop TV Faves
The Easy Kitchen
The Healthy Way
The Sale Rack
This Just In'''What Women WantOther programsAuto Focus (Motoring informative; moved to Solar Sports)Breakfast with Moms (simulcast on Mom's Radio)Business and Leisure (Business and lifestyle informative; moved to Solar Sports)Superbrands (Special programming)

Previously aired
 Shop TV Live''

Shop TV hosts
 Giannina Van Hoven
 Mon Gualvez (also with TV5 and Radyo Singko)
 Gianna Llanes (also with Wave 891; formerly from Myx)
 Tetsuhiro Suzuki aka. "Show Suzuki" (also with Q Radio 105.1, and also a voice-over for Sing Galing; formerly from Republ1ka FM1)
 Mica Pineda
 Colleen Mateo (also with Win Radio Manila; formerly with Love Radio Manila and DWIZ 882)
 Mara Lopez
 KA Antonio (also with Light TV 33)
 RX Carzo
 Bea Tan Siman (also with Chinatown TV / IBC)
 Adi Amor (formerly from O Shopping)
 VJ Mendoza
 Valerie Tan (guest host; also with GMA News TV and CNN Philippines)
 Shine Kuk (guest host; formerly from GMA Network and ABS-CBN)
 Jamie Gabuya (formerly from O Shopping)
 Sandro Hermoso (formerly from O Shopping and PTV)
 Justine Peña (formerly from O Shopping)
 Maiko Williams (formerly from O Shopping)
 Kyle Ortega (formerly from O Shopping)

Previously aired on these networks
 ETC/SBN, as Home Shopping Network (2004-2007)
 IBC, as Home Shopping Network (2004–2011, 2014–2015)
 RJTV, as Shop TV (2007-2018)
 GMA News TV, as Shop TV (2015–19, in association with Solar Entertainment Corporation)
 TV5, as Shop TV (2019)
 BEAM TV, as Shop TV (2016-2018)
 GMA Network, as Shop TV (2015–2016, in association with Solar Entertainment Corporation)
 AksyonTV (now known as One Sports), as Shop TV (2016, re-run, 2017–2018)
 RPN, as Home Shopping Network (2003–2015, in association with Solar Entertainment Corporation)
 Jack TV, as Shop TV

See also
 SolarFlix, free TV partner of Shop TV
 O Shopping (former rival shopping channel)

References

Shopping networks
Television networks in the Philippines
Solar Entertainment Corporation channels
English-language television stations in the Philippines
Television channels and stations established in 2005